Thalassoanaperus is a genus of worms belonging to the family Convolutidae.

?The species of this genus are found in Europe.

Species:

Thalassoanaperus australis 
Thalassoanaperus biaculeatus 
Thalassoanaperus gardineri 
Thalassoanaperus ornatus 
Thalassoanaperus rubellus 
Thalassoanaperus singularis 
Thalassoanaperus sulcatus 
Thalassoanaperus tvaerminnensis

References

Acoelomorphs